VOY or Voy may refer to:

 Star Trek: Voyager, a science fiction television series in the Star Trek franchise
 Voices of Youth, an organization set up by UNICEF to help children from across the world exchange knowledge and ideas
 Voy, a settlement in the Orkney Islands of the north of Scotland
 Voy's Beach, a settlement located northwest of Corner Brook
 Voy (study abroad), a study abroad organization in the United States
 Wikivoyage, with interwiki code "voy"

See also
 Mazet-Saint-Voy, Haute-Loire, France; a commune which contains the parish of Saint-Voy de Bonas (Saint-Voy)

fr:VOY